Midway, also known as Peetsville, is an unincorporated community in Copiah County, Mississippi, United States.

A post office operated under the name Peetsville from 1893 to 1905.

References

Unincorporated communities in Copiah County, Mississippi
Unincorporated communities in Mississippi